The CS/LS7 (military designation QCQ-171) is a submachine gun developed by the Jianshe Industries (Group) Corporation of Chongqing. The CS/LS7 is chambered in Chinese 9×19mm DAP-92 ammunition or 9×19mm Parabellum round.

Development
The CS/LS7 is part of a weapon development program initiated by Chinese police department to acquire a new type of submachine gun, replacing old Type 79 submachine gun. After trials, CS/LS7 was selected to be the next-generation submachine gun for the Chinese police force, and was first showcased on the 70th anniversary of the People's Republic of China parade. However, Chinese military had no request of any submachine gun, thus initially CS/LS7 has no official military designation from the People's Liberation Army (PLA).

Design
The weapon features a full-length picatinny rail on top of the upper-receiver and handguard. Three short picatinny rails are mounted on the 3, 6, and 12 o'clock position of the handguard. A secondary handguard option has picatinny rail only on the receiver and 6 o'clock position of the handguard. The third option, seen in the hands of PLA soldiers on 70th anniversary parade, features short picatinny rails mounted on 6 and 9 o'clock position, but not on 3 and 12. It's possible that handguard configurations can be changed upon customer requests.

The CS/LS7 uses blowback, closed bolt operation. The upper-receiver is made of metal while lower-receiver is made of polymer material. The weapon has ambidextrous charging handle, fire-selector, and lengthened magazine release lever located in front of the trigger guard. The telescopic stock can be removed and replaced by a fixed stock. Bolt release is located on the left side above the magazine well. The handguard can also be replaced with an integrated front grip, similar to that of MP5K.The weapon is also fitted with QMQ-171 holographic sight.

Users
: People's Armed Police,Ministry of Public Security, People's Liberation Army (limited service).
: Venezuelan Army
: Algerian Army

See also
 CS/LS5
 CS/LS06

References

Submachine guns of the People's Republic of China
9mm Parabellum submachine guns
Police weapons